Patti Anne Lodge (born July 29, 1942) is a Republican Idaho State Senator representing District 11 since 2012. She previously represented District 13 of the Idaho Senate from 2002 to 2012 and District 11 from 2000-2002.

Early life and career 
Born in Pittsburgh, Pennsylvania, Lodge moved to Idaho at age four, where she attended Boise State University, Idaho State University, Northwest Nazarene University, and the University of Idaho. She received her BA in 1964, at Marylhurst University in Oregon.

She has been a consultant at Saint Paul’s School, Our Lady of the Valley since 1999, and president of Wind Ridge Vineyards since 1988.

She was previously a media educator at Caldwell School District from 1968 to 1999 and media coordinator at Caldwell School District from 1982 to 1997.

She was in the Legislative Council from 2002 to 2006.

She is a member of the American Legislative Exchange Council (ALEC), serving as Idaho state leader.

Elections

Committees 
Lodge serves on the following committees:
 Health and Welfare
 Judiciary and Rules
 Millennium Fund (co-chair)
 State Affairs (chair)

Organizations 
Outside of her legislative duties, Lodge has the following positions:
 Advisory Board of Boise State University since 2002
 State Finance Chair of Idaho Republican Party since 2001
 Member of Idaho Catholic Foundation since 1992

Personal life
She is married to Edward Lodge, a United States federal judge for the United States District Court for the District of Idaho and is a mother to three children.

References

External links 
 Official government profile at the Idaho Legislature
 Campaign website
 
 Patti Anne Lodge at Freedom Speaks

1942 births
Living people
Boise State University alumni
Republican Party Idaho state senators
Idaho State University alumni
Marylhurst University alumni
Northwest Nazarene University alumni
Politicians from Pittsburgh
University of Idaho alumni
Women state legislators in Idaho
21st-century American politicians
21st-century American women politicians